Wassim Rezgui (born April 24, 1986), is a Tunisian football player currently playing for Hilal of Benghazi in the Libyan Premier League.

Clubs 
2007-08:  Club Africain
2008-09:  AS Marsa
2009-10:  Al-Hilal
2010-11:  Aschat
2013-14:  SC Ben Arous
2015   :  SV Schüren
2015-17:  Holzwickeder SC
2017-18:  SV Schüren
2020-  :  Grombalia

References 

1986 births
Living people
Tunisian footballers
Tunisian expatriate footballers
Tunisian Ligue Professionnelle 1 players
Club Africain players
AS Marsa players
Al-Hilal SC (Benghazi) players
SC Ben Arous players
Grombalia Sports players
Expatriate footballers in Libya
Expatriate footballers in Germany
Tunisian expatriate sportspeople in Libya
Tunisian expatriate sportspeople in Germany
Association football forwards
Libyan Premier League players